The 2008 Naisten Liiga, part of the 2008 Finnish football season, was the second season of the 2006 established Naisten Liiga. FC Honka were the defending champions, having won the 2007 season. SC Raisio withdrew from the league and was replaced by TPS Turku.

Teams

League table

Relegation play-offs

TiPS won 4–3 on aggregate.

Top scorers

Personal awards 
Top scorer: Nina Hietanen, FC Kuusysi
Player of the year: Jaana Lyytikäinen, FC Honka
Referee of the year: Kirsi Savolainen

Sources 
Finland - List of Women League First Level Tables Rec.Sport.Soccer Statistics Foundation

References

External links 
Naisten Liiga Official Homepage (in Finnish)

Kansallinen Liiga seasons
Naisten
Finland
Finland